The Krughütte Solar Park is a 29.1-megawatt (MW) photovoltaic power station in Eisleben, Germany.

The solar farm is located in the state of Saxony-Anhalt and was developed and constructed by German project developers SRU Solar AG, Berga and Parabel AG, Berlin, who continue to operate the farm.

See also

List of photovoltaic power stations
PV system
Solar power in Germany
Electricity sector in Germany

References

Photovoltaic power stations in Germany